The 2022–23 Middle Tennessee Blue Raiders women's basketball team represents Middle Tennessee State University during the 2022–23 NCAA Division I women's basketball season. The team is led by eighteenth-year head coach Rick Insell, and plays their home games at the Murphy Center in Murfreesboro, Tennessee as a member of Conference USA.

Roster

Schedule and results

|-
!colspan=12 style=| Exhibition

|-
!colspan=12 style=| Non-conference regular season

|-
!colspan=12 style=| CUSA regular season

|-
!colspan=12 style=| CUSA Tournament

|-
!colspan=12 style=|NCAA Women's Tournament

Rankings

*The preseason and week 1 polls were the same.^Coaches did not release a week 2 poll.

See also
 2022–23 Middle Tennessee Blue Raiders men's basketball team

Notes

References

Middle Tennessee Blue Raiders women's basketball seasons
Middle Tennessee Blue Raiders
Middle Tennessee Blue Raiders women's basketball
Middle Tennessee Blue Raiders women's basketball
Middle Tennessee